Derek Eugene Cooper known as Mick Cooper (1923-1997) was an England international lawn bowls competitor.

Bowls career
He represented England at the 1966 World Outdoor Bowls Championship where he won a bronze medal in the team event (Leonard Trophy). He was a member of the triples and fours.

He won the 1965 and 1969 fours title at the England Men's National Championships when bowling for Kettering Lodge BC.

He started bowling in 1951.

References

1923 births
1997 deaths
English male bowls players